This is an incomplete list of states that have existed on the present-day territory of Georgia since ancient times. It includes de facto independent entities like the major medieval Duchies (saeristavo).

Antiquity
 Kingdom of Diauehi (12th–8th centuries BC)
 Kingdom of Colchis (550–164 BC)
 Kingdom of Lazica (6th century BC – 7th century AD)
Kingdom of Iberia (302 BC – 580 AD)

Early Middle Ages
Principate of Iberia (580–888)
 Emirate of Tbilisi (736–1122)
 Kingdom of Abkhazia (778–1008)
 Kingdom of Hereti (787–1014)
 Principality of Kakheti (787–1014)
Bagratid Iberia (888–1008)
Unified Kingdom of Kakheti and Hereti (1014–1104)

Unification and fragmentation (11th–18th centuries)

Kingdoms
 Kingdom of Georgia (978–1466)
Kingdom of Kartli (1484–1762)
 Kingdom of Kakheti (1455–1762)
Kingdom of Kartli and Kakheti (1762–1801)
 Kingdom of Imereti (1455–1810)

Principalities
Principality of Samtskhe (1268–1628)
 Principality of Guria (1460s–1829)
 Principality of Svaneti (1460s–1857)
 Principality of Mingrelia (1557–1857)
 Principality of Abkhazia (1660–1866)

Duchies
Duchy of Kldekari (876–1103)
 Duchy of Racha (1050–1789)
 Duchy of Aragvi (1380–1747)
Duchy of Ksani (15th century – 1801)

Modern history
Republic of Guria (1905–1906)
Democratic Republic of Georgia (1918–1921)
Georgian Soviet Socialist Republic (1921–1991)
Republic of Georgia (1991–present)

 List
Georgia